General Zorn may refer to:

Eberhard Zorn (born 1960), German Army general 
Eduard Zorn (1901–1945), German Wehrmacht officer posthumously promoted to major general
Hans Zorn (1891–1943), German Wehrmacht general